Coxa may refer to:

 Nickname of Brazilian association football team Coritiba Foot Ball Club
 Theta Leonis, a star
 Hip, below the lateral side of the abdomen
 Arthropod coxa, the short most-proximal base jointed segment of the arthropod leg
 An orthopaedic hospital in Tampere 
 Both meanings come from Latin coxa = "hip"